The following list identifies every constituency used in Parliamentary etc. elections in Ireland (including Northern Ireland). The list consists of 'index names' for the seat and to identify what is potentially to be covered in a single constituency article.

The index name, which may vary from the official name or the name commonly used for a constituency in some respects, is constructed by putting the name of the geographical area first. If necessary (to distinguish between a borough constituency and a county constituency with the same geographical name) 'Borough', 'Cities', 'City' or 'Town' will be the second word of the Index Name to indicate the borough constituency. A compass point or more distinctive divisional name is to be placed next.

Special cases: 
Dublin. The PHC constituency combined the city and county and its index name is 'Dublin'. The IHC and HC (pre-1885) constituencies follow the usual rule and are indexed as 'Dublin' and 'Dublin City'. The Dublin Harbour division of Dublin City is indexed simply as 'Dublin Harbour'. There have been North and South divisions of both the county and city as well as the complication that the Republic of Ireland ceased the division between borough and county constituencies in the 1970s. The modern North Dublin and South Dublin seem descended from the county rather than the city equivalents but the names commonly used do not make this clear. The index names used for the Dublin City divisions are 'Dublin City North' and 'Dublin City South'. The inclusion of county in the official names of the county divisions is not reflected in the index names.
Universities. 'National University of Ireland' and 'Queen's University of Belfast' are special cases.

Institutions
The institutions included in this list are:

Irish House of Commons (IHC)
Irish seats in First Protectorate Parliament of the Commonwealth of England, Scotland and Ireland (PP)
Irish (and Northern Irish) seats in the United Kingdom House of Commons (UKHC)
Dáil Éireann (DÉ)
House of Commons of Southern Ireland (SIHC)
House of Commons of Northern Ireland (NIHC)
University constituencies in Seanad Éireann (SE)
Northern Ireland Assembly (NIA)
Northern Ireland Constitutional Convention (NICC)
Northern Ireland Forum (NIF)
Irish and Northern Irish constituencies in the European Parliament (EP)

List of Constituencies


A
 Antrim:
 Antrim (UKHC)
 Antrim (NIHC)
 Antrim Bann Side (NIHC). See: Bannside
 Antrim Borough:
 Antrim Borough (NIHC) County Division
 Antrim Borough (IHC) Borough
 Antrim Carrick (NIHC) See: Carrick
 Antrim County (IHC)
 Antrim East See under "East Antrim"
 Antrim Larkfield (NIHC) See: Larkfield
 Antrim Larne (NIHC) See: Larne
 Antrim Mid See under "Mid Antrim"
 Antrim Newtownabbey (NIHC) See: Newtownabbey
 Antrim North See under "North Antrim"
 Antrim South See under "South Antrim"
 Ardee (IHC)
 Ardfert (IHC)
 Ards (NIHC)
 Armagh:
 Armagh (NIA)
 Armagh (NIHC)
 Armagh (UKHC)
 Armagh Borough (IHC)
 Armagh Central (Northern Ireland Parliament constituency) (NIHC) See: Central Armagh
 Armagh City (UKHC)
 Armagh County (IHC) County
 Armagh Mid (Northern Ireland Parliament constituency) (NIHC) See: Mid Armagh (UKHC)
 Armagh North (Northern Ireland Parliament constituency) (NIHC) See under "North Armagh"
 Armagh South (Northern Ireland Parliament constituency) (NIHC) See: South Armagh
 Askeaton (IHC)
 Athboy (IHC)
 Athenry (IHC)
 Athlone:
 Athlone (IHC)
 Athlone (UKHC)
 Athlone–Longford (DÉ)
 Athy (IHC)
 Augher (IHC)

B
 Ballynakill (IHC)
 Ballyshannon (IHC)
 Baltimore (IHC)
 Baltinglass (IHC)
 Banagher (IHC)
 Bandonbridge (IHC)
 Bandon (UKHC)
 Bandon and Kinsale (PP)
 Bangor:
 Bangor (IHC) 
 Bangor (NIHC)
 Bannow (IHC)
 Bannside (NIHC)
 Belfast:
 Belfast IHC
 Belfast (UKHC)
 Belfast Ballynafeigh (NIHC)
 Belfast Bloomfield (NIHC)
 Belfast Central (NIHC)
 Belfast Cromac:
 Belfast Cromac (DÉ) 
 Belfast Cromac (NIHC)
 Belfast Cromac
 Belfast Dock (NIHC)
 Belfast Duncairn:
 Belfast Duncairn (NIHC)
 Belfast Duncairn (UKHC)
 Belfast East:
 Belfast East (NIA)
 Belfast East (NICC)
 Belfast East (NIF)
 Belfast East (NIHC)
 Belfast East (UKHC)
 Belfast Falls:
 Belfast Falls (NIHC)
 Belfast Falls (UKHC)
 Belfast North:
 Belfast North (NIA)
 Belfast North (NICC)
 Belfast North (NIF)
 Belfast North (NIHC)
 Belfast North (UKHC)
 Belfast Oldpark (NIHC)
 Belfast Ormeau (UKHC)
 Belfast Pottinger:
 Belfast Pottinger (NIHC)
 Belfast Pottinger (UKHC)
 Belfast St Anne's:
 Belfast St Anne's (NIHC)
 Belfast St Anne's (UKHC)
 Belfast Shankill:
 Belfast Shankill (NIHC)
 Belfast Shankill (UKHC)
 Belfast South:
 Belfast South (NIA)
 Belfast South (NICC)
 Belfast South (NIF)
 Belfast South (NIHC)
 Belfast South (UKHC)
 Belfast Victoria:
 Belfast Victoria (NIHC)
 Belfast Victoria (UKHC)
 Belfast West:
 Belfast West (NIA)
 Belfast West (NICC)
 Belfast West (NIF)
 Belfast West (NIHC)
 Belfast West (UKHC)
 Belfast Willowfield (NIHC)
 Belfast Windsor (NIHC)
 Belfast Woodvale:
 Belfast Woodvale (NIHC)
 Belfast Woodvale (UKHC)
 Belturbet (IHC)
 Blessington (IHC)
 Boyle (IHC)

C
 Callan (IHC)
 Carlingford (IHC)
 Carlow Borough:
 Carlow Borough (IHC) Also named "Carlow Town" Borough
 Carlow Borough (UKHC)
 Carlow County: 
 Carlow County (IHC)
 Carlow County (UKHC)
 Carlow–Kildare (DÉ)
 Carlow–Kilkenny: 
 Carlow–Kilkenny (DÉ)
 Carlow–Kilkenny (SIHC)
 Carlow, Wexford, Kilkenny and Queen's (PP)
 Carrick: 
 Carrick (IHC)
 Carrick (NIHC)
 Carrickfergus:
 Carrickfergus (IHC)
 Carrickfergus (UKHC)
 Carrickfergus and Belfast (PP)
 Carysfort (IHC)
 Cashel
 Cashel IHC
 Cashel (UKHC)
 Castlebar (IHC)
 Castlemartyr (IHC)
 Causeway (UKHC)
 Cavan: 
 Cavan (UKHC)
 Cavan (DÉ) County
 Cavan Borough (IHC)
 Cavan County (IHC) County
 Cavan East (UK Parliament constituency) (UKHC) See: Cavan County (UKHC)
 Cavan, Fermanagh and Monaghan (PP)
 Cavan–Monaghan (DÉ)
 Cavan West (UK Parliament constituency) (UKHC) See: West Cavan (UKHC)
 Central Armagh (UKHC)
 Charlemont (IHC)
 Charleville (IHC)
 City of Londonderry
 Clare: 
 Clare (IHC)
 Clare (UKHC)
 Clare (SIHC)
 Clare (DÉ)
 Clare East See: East Clare
 Clare–South Galway (DÉ)
 Clare West See: West Clare
 Clogher (IHC)
 Clonakilty (IHC)
 Clonmel: 
 Clonmel (IHC) 
 Clonmel (UKHC)
 Clonmines (IHC)
 Coleraine: 
 Coleraine (IHC)
 Coleraine (UKHC)
 Connacht–Ulster (EP)
 Cork and Youghall (PP) Borough
 Cork Borough: 
 Cork Borough (DÉ)
 Cork Borough (SIHC)
 Cork City: 
 Cork City (IHC)
 Cork City (DÉ)
 Cork City (UKHC)
 Cork City North-West (DÉ)
 Cork City South-East (DÉ)
 Cork County: 
 Cork County (PP) County
 Cork County (UKHC)
 Cork East (DÉ) See also under "East Cork"
 Cork East and North East: 
 Cork East and North East (DÉ)
 Cork East and North East (SIHC)
 Cork Mid (DÉ) See also under "Mid Cork"
 Cork Mid, North, South, South East and West: 
 Cork Mid, North, South, South East and West (DÉ)
 Cork Mid, North, South, South East and West (SIHC)
 Cork North (DÉ) See also under "North Cork"
 Cork North-Central (DÉ)
 Cork North-East (DÉ)
 Cork North-West (DÉ)
 Cork South (DÉ) See also under "South Cork"
 Cork South-Central (DÉ)
 Cork South-East (DÉ)
 Cork South-West (DÉ)
 Cork West (DÉ) See also under "West Cork"
 County Limerick (UKHC)
 County Louth (UKHC)
 County Wexford (UKHC)

D
 Derry and Coleraine (PP) Borough
 Derry, Donegal and Tyrone (PP)
 Dingle (IHC)
 Donegal:
 Donegal (DÉ) County
 Donegal (UKHC) County
 Donegal Borough (IHC) 
 Donegal County (IHC) 
 Donegal East (DÉ)
 Donegal East (UKHC) See: East Donegal (UKHC)
 Donegal–Leitrim (DÉ)
 Donegal North (UKHC) See: North Donegal (UKHC)
 Donegal South (UK Parliament constituency) (UKHC) See: South Donegal (UKHC)
 Donegal North-East (DÉ)
 Donegal South-West (DÉ)
 Donegal West (DÉ)
 Donegal West (UKHC) See: West Donegal (UKHC)
 Doneraile (IHC)
 Down:
 Down (IHC) County
 Down (UKHC) County
 Down, Antrim and Armagh (PP)
 Down Ards (Northern Ireland Parliament constituency) (NIHC) See: Ards
 Down Bangor (Northern Ireland Parliament constituency) (NIHC) See: Bangor (NIHC)
 Down East:
 Down East (Northern Ireland Parliament constituency) (NIHC) See: East Down 
 Down East (UK Parliament constituency) (UKHC) See: East Down
 Down Iveagh (Northern Ireland Parliament constituency) (NIHC) See: Iveagh
 Down Mid:
 Down Mid (Northern Ireland Parliament constituency) (NIHC) See: Mid Down
 Down Mid (UK Parliament constituency) (UKHC) See: Mid Down
 Down Mourne (Northern Ireland Parliament constituency) (NIHC) See: Mourne
 Down North:
 Down North (Assembly constituency) (NIA) See: North Down
 Down North (NICC)
 Down North (NIF)
 Down North (Northern Ireland Parliament constituency) (NIHC) See: North Down (NIHC)
 Down North (UK Parliament constituency) (UKHC) See: North Down (UKHC)
 Down South:
 Down South (Assembly constituency) (NIA) See: South Down (NIA)
 Down South (NICC)
 Down South (NIF)
 Down South (Northern Ireland Parliament constituency) (NIHC) See: South Down
 Down South (UK Parliament constituency) (UKHC) See: South Down
 Down West:
 Down West (Northern Ireland Parliament constituency) (NIHC) See: West Down
 Down West (UK Parliament constituency) (UKHC) See: West Down
 Downpatrick:
 Downpatrick (IHC)
 Downpatrick (UKHC)
 Drogheda:
 Drogheda (IHC) 
 Drogheda (UKHC)
 Dublin (EP)
 Dublin Artane (DÉ)
 Dublin Ballyfermot (DÉ)
 Dublin Cabra (DÉ)
 Dublin Central (DÉ)
 Dublin City:
 Dublin City (IHC)
 Dublin City (UKHC)
 Dublin Clontarf:
 Dublin Clontarf (DÉ)
 Dublin Clontarf (UKHC)
 Dublin College Green:
 Dublin College Green (DÉ)
 Dublin College Green (UKHC)
 Dublin County:
 Dublin County (IHC)
 Dublin County (UKHC)
 Dublin Finglas (DÉ)
 Dublin Harbour (UKHC)
 Dublin Mid (DÉ)
 Dublin Mid-West(constituency):
 Dublin Mid-West (DÉ)
 Dublin Mid West (SIHC)
 Dublin North(constituency):
 Dublin City North (DÉ)
 Dublin North (DÉ)
 Dublin North (UK Parliament constituency) (UKHC) See: North Dublin (UKHC)
 Dublin North-Central (DÉ)
 Dublin North-East (DÉ)
 Dublin North-West:
 Dublin North-West (DÉ)
 Dublin North West (SIHC)
 Dublin Pembroke (UKHC)
 Dublin Rathdown (DÉ)
 Dublin Rathmines (UKHC)
 Dublin Rathmines West (DÉ)
 Dublin St James's (UKHC)
 Dublin St Michan's (UKHC)
 Dublin St Patrick's (UKHC)
 Dublin St Stephen's Green (UKHC)
 Dublin South:
 Dublin South (SIHC)
 Dublin City South (DÉ)
 Dublin South (DÉ)
 Dublin South (UK Parliament constituency) (UKHC) See: South Dublin
 Dublin South-Central (DÉ)
 Dublin South-East (DÉ)
 Dublin South-West (DÉ)
 Dublin Townships (DÉ)
 Dublin University:
 University of Dublin (IHC)
 University of Dublin (UKHC)
 University of Dublin (DÉ)
 University of Dublin (SIHC)
 University of Dublin (SE)
 Dublin West (DÉ)
 Duleek (IHC)
 Dún Laoghaire (DÉ)
 Dundalk:
 Dundalk (IHC) 
 Dundalk (UKHC)
 Dungannon:
 Dungannon (IHC) 
 Dungannon (UKHC)
 Dungarvan:
 Dungarvan (IHC) 
 Dungarvan (UKHC)
 Dunleer (IHC)

E
 East (EP)
 East Antrim:
 East Antrim (NIA)
 East Antrim (NIF)
 East Antrim (UKHC)
 East Cavan (UKHC)
 East Clare (UKHC) See also under "Clare East"
 East Cork (UKHC) See also under "Cork East"
 East Donegal (UKHC) See also "Donegal East"
 East Down:
 East Down (NIHC) See also "Down East"
 East Down (UKHC)
 East Galway (UKHC)
 East Kerry (UKHC)
 East Limerick (UKHC) See also under "Limerick East"
 East Londonderry:
 East Londonderry
 East Londonderry (NIA)
 East Londonderry (NIF) 
 East Mayo (UKHC) See also under "Mayo North"
 East Tipperary (UKHC)
 East Tyrone
 East Tyrone (UKHC)
 East Waterford (UKHC)
 East Wicklow (UKHC)
 Ennis:
 Ennis (IHC) 
 Ennis (UKHC)
Enniscorthy (IHC)
 Enniskillen:
 Enniskillen (IHC)
 Enniskillen (NIHC)
 Enniskillen (UKHC)

F
 Fermanagh (IHC) County
 Fermanagh and Tyrone:
 Fermanagh and Tyrone (NIHC)
 Fermanagh and Tyrone (UKHC)
 Fermanagh and South Tyrone:
 Fermanagh and South Tyrone (NIA)
 Fermanagh and South Tyrone (NICC)
 Fermanagh and South Tyrone (NIF)
 Fermanagh and South Tyrone (UKHC)
 Fermanagh Enniskillen (Northern Ireland Parliament constituency) (NIHC) See: Enniskillen (NIHC)
 Fermanagh Lisnaskea (Northern Ireland Parliament constituency) (NIHC) See: Lisnaskea (NIHC)
 Fermanagh North:
 Fermanagh North (DÉ)
 Fermanagh North (UK Parliament constituency) (UKHC) See: North Fermanagh
 Fermanagh South:
 Fermanagh South (Northern Ireland Parliament constituency) (NIHC) See: South Fermanagh (NIHC)
 Fermanagh South (UK Parliament constituency) (UKHC) See: South Fermanagh
 Fethard:
 Fethard (IHC)
 Fethard (IHC)
 Fore (IHC)
 Foyle:
 Foyle (NIA)
 Foyle (NIF) 
 Foyle (NIHC)
 Foyle (UKHC)

G
 Galway (DÉ)
 Galway and Mayo (PP) County
 Galway Borough:
 Galway Borough (IHC)
 Galway Borough (UKHC)
 Galway Connemara (UKHC)
 Galway County (IHC)
 Galway East:
 Galway East (UK Parliament constituency) (UKHC) See: East Galway
 Galway East (DÉ)
 Galway North:
 Galway North (UK Parliament constituency)(UKHC) See: North Galway
 Galway North (DÉ)
 Galway North-East (DÉ)
 Galway South:
 Galway South (DÉ)
 Galway South (UK Parliament constituency) (UKHC) See: South Galway
 Galway West (DÉ)
 Gorey (IHC)
 Gowran (IHC)
 Granard (IHC)

H
 Harristown (IHC)
 Hillsborough (IHC)

I
 Inistioge (IHC)
 Ireland East (European Parliament constituency) (EP) See: East
 Ireland North-West (European Parliament constituency) (EP) See: North-West
 Ireland South (European Parliament constituency) (EP) See: South
 Iveagh (NIHC) See also "Down Iveagh".

J
 Jamestown (IHC)

K
 Kells (IHC) County
 Kerry, Limerick and Clare (PP)
 Kerry–Limerick West:
 Kerry–Limerick West (DÉ)
 Kerry–Limerick West (SIHC)
 Kerry (IHC)
 Kerry East (UK Parliament constituency) (UKHC) See: East Kerry (UKHC)
 Kerry North (constituency:
 Kerry North (DÉ)
 Kerry North (UK Parliament constituency) (UKHC) See: North Kerry (UKHC)
 Kerry South:
 Kerry South (DÉ)
 Kerry South (UK Parliament constituency) (UKHC) See: South Kerry (UKHC)
 Kerry West (UK Parliament constituency) (UKHC) See: West Kerry (UKHC)
 Kilbeggan (IHC)
 Kildare Borough (IHC)
 Kildare County (IHC)
 Kildare North:
 Kildare North (DÉ)
 Kildare North (UK Parliament constituency) (UKHC) See: North Kildare (UKHC)
 Kildare South:
 Kildare South (DÉ)
 Kildare South (UK Parliament constituency) (UKHC) See: South Kildare (UKHC)
 Kildare–Wicklow:
 Kildare–Wicklow (PP)
 Kildare–Wicklow (DÉ)
 Kildare–Wicklow (SIHC)
 Kilkenny City:
 Kilkenny City (IHC)
 Kilkenny City (UKHC)
 Kildare County (IHC)
 Kilkenny North (UK Parliament constituency) (UKHC) See: North Kilkenny
 Kilkenny South (UK Parliament constituency) (UKHC) See: South Kilkenny
 Killybegs (IHC)
 Killyleagh (IHC)
 Kilmallock (IHC)
 King's County:
 King's County (IHC)
 King's County (UKHC)
 King's County Birr (UKHC)
 King's County Tullamore (UKHC)
 Kinsale:
 Kinsale (IHC)
 Kinsale (UKHC)
 Knocktopher (IHC)

L
 Lagan Valley:
 Lagan Valley (NIA)
 Lagan Valley (NIF) 
 Lagan Valley (NIHC)
 Lagan Valley (UKHC)
 Lanesborough (IHC)
 Laois–Offaly:
 Laois–Offaly (SIHC)
 Laois–Offaly (DÉ)
 Larkfield (NIHC)
 Larne (NIHC)
 Leinster (EP) 
 Leitrim:
 Leitrim (IHC) County
 Leitrim (UKHC)
 Leitrim (DÉ)
 Leitrim North (UK Parliament constituency) (UKHC) See: North Leitrim
 Leitrim South (UK Parliament constituency) (UKHC) See: South Leitrim
 Leitrim–Roscommon North (DÉ)
 Leitrim–Sligo (DÉ)
 Lifford (IHC)
 Limerick (DÉ)
 Limerick City:
 Limerick City (DÉ)
 Limerick City (UKHC)
 Limerick City (IHC)
 Limerick City and Killmallock (PP)
 Limerick City–Limerick East:
 Limerick City–Limerick East (SIHC)
 Limerick City–Limerick East (DÉ)
 Limerick County:
 Limerick County (IHC)
 Limerick County )(UK Parliament constituency) See: County Limerick
 Limerick East:
 Limerick East (DÉ)
 Limerick East (UK Parliament constituency) (UKHC) See: East Limerick
 Limerick West:
 Limerick West (DÉ)
 Limerick West (UK Parliament constituency) (UKHC) See: West Limerick
 Lisburn:
 Lisburn (IHC)
 Lisburn (UKHC)
 Lisburn (IHC)
 Lismore (IHC)
 Lisnaskea (NIHC)
 Londonderry:
 Londonderry (UKHC)
 Londonderry (NIA)
 Londonderry (NIHC)
 Londonderry (NICC)
 Londonderry City: 
  Londonderry City (IHC)
  Londonderry City (DÉ)
  Londonderry City (UKHC)
  Londonderry City (Northern Ireland Parliament constituency) (NIHC) See: City of Londonderry
 Londonderry City (IHC)
 Londonderry County (IHC)
 Londonderry East: See "East Londonderry"
 Londonderry Mid (NIHC) See: Mid Londonderry
 Londonderry North: See "North Londonderry"
 Londonderry South:
 Londonderry South (UK Parliament constituency) (UKHC) See: South Londonderry
 Londonderry South (Northern Ireland Parliament constituency) (NIHC) See: Mid Londonderry
 Longford (UKHC)
 Longford Borough (IHC)
 Longford County (IHC)
 Longford North (UK Parliament constituency) (UKHC) See: North Longford
 Longford–Roscommon (DÉ)
 Longford South (UK Parliament constituency) (UKHC) See: South Longford
 Longford–Westmeath:
 Longford–Westmeath (SIHC)
 Longford–Westmeath (DÉ)
 Louth (Dáil constituency):
 Louth (DÉ)
 Louth (UK Parliament constituency) (UKHC) See: County Louth (UKHC)
 Louth (IHC)
 Louth–Meath:
 Louth–Meath (SIHC)
 Louth–Meath (DÉ)
 Louth–Meath (PP)
 Louth North (UK Parliament constituency) (UKHC) See: North Louth
 Louth South (UK Parliament constituency) (UKHC) See: South Louth

M
 Mallow:
 Mallow (IHC)
 Mallow (UKHC)
 Maryborough (IHC)
 Mayo:
 Mayo (IHC) County
 Mayo (DÉ)
 Mayo (UKHC)
 Mayo East:
 Mayo East (DÉ)
 Mayo East (UK Parliament constituency) (UKHC) See: East Mayo
 Mayo North:
 Mayo North (DÉ)
 Mayo North (UK Parliament constituency) (UKHC) See: North Mayo
 Mayo North and West:
 Mayo North and West (DÉ)
 Mayo North and West (SIHC)
 Mayo South:
 Mayo South (DÉ)
 Mayo South (UK Parliament constituency) (UKHC) See: South Mayo
 Mayo South–Roscommon South:
 Mayo South–Roscommon South (DÉ)
 Mayo South–Roscommon South (SIHC)
 Mayo West:
 Mayo West (DÉ)
 Mayo West (UK Parliament constituency) (UKHC) See: West Mayo
 Meath:
 Meath (IHC)
 Meath (DÉ)
 Meath (UKHC)
 Meath East (DÉ)
 Meath North (UK Parliament constituency) (UKHC) See: North Meath
 Meath South (UK Parliament constituency) (UKHC) See: South Meath
 Meath West (DÉ)
 Meath–Westmeath (DÉ)
 Mid Antrim:
 Mid Antrim (DÉ)
 Mid Antrim (NIHC)
 Mid Antrim (UKHC)
 Mid Armagh (UKHC) 
 Mid Cork (UKHC) See also under "Cork Mid"
 Mid Down:
 Mid Down (NIHC) See also under "Down Mid"
 Mid Down (UKHC)
 Mid Londonderry (NIHC)
 Mid Tipperary (UKHC)
 Mid Tyrone:
 Mid Tyrone
 Mid Tyrone (UKHC)
 Mid Ulster:
 Mid Ulster (NIA)
 Mid Ulster (UKHC)
 Midleton (IHC)
 Monaghan (Dáil constituency):
 Monaghan (DÉ) County
 Monaghan (SIHC) County
 Monaghan (UKHC) County
 Monaghan Borough (IHC)
 Monaghan County (IHC)
 Monaghan North (UK Parliament constituency) (UKHC) See: North Monaghan (UKHC)
 Monaghan South (UK Parliament constituency) (UKHC) See: South Monaghan
 Mourne (NIHC)
 Mullingar (IHC)
 Munster (EP)

N
 Naas (IHC)
 National University of Ireland:
 National University of Ireland (Dáil constituency) (DÉ)
 National University of Ireland (Dáil constituency) (SIHC)
 National University of Ireland (Seanad Éireann constituency) (SE)
 National University of Ireland (UK Parliament constituency) (UKHC)
 Navan (IHC)
 New Ross:
 New Ross (IHC)
 New Ross (UKHC)
 Newcastle (IHC)
 Newry:
 Newry (IHC)
 Newry (UKHC)
 Newry (IHC)
 Newry and Armagh:
 Newry and Armagh (NIA)
 Newry and Armagh (NIF)
 Newry and Armagh (UKHC)
 Newtownabbey (NIHC)
 Newtown Limavady (IHC)
 Newtownards (IHC)
 Northern Ireland (EP)
 North Antrim:
 North Antrim (NIA)
 North Antrim (NICC)
 North Antrim (NIF)
 North Antrim (NIHC)
 North Antrim (UKHC)
 North Armagh (UKHC) See also under "Armagh North"
 North Cork (UKHC) See also under "Cork North"
 North Dublin (UKHC)
 North Donegal (UKHC) See also under "Donegal North"
 North Down: See also under "Down North"
 North Down (NIA)
 North Down (NIHC) See also under "Down North"
 North Down
 North Fermanagh (UKHC)
 North Galway (UKHC)
 North Kilkenny
 North Kildare (UKHC) See also "Kildare North"
 North Kerry (UKHC) See also "Kerry North"
 North Leitrim 
 North Londonderry:
 North Londonderry (UKHC)
 North Londonderry (NIHC)
 North Longford (UKHC)
 North Louth (UKHC)
 North Mayo (UKHC) See also under "Mayo North"
 North Meath (UKHC)
 North Monaghan (UKHC)
 North Roscommon (UKHC)
 North Sligo (UKHC)
 North Tipperary (UKHC)
 North Tyrone:
 North Tyrone (NIHC)
 North Tyrone (UKHC)
 North East Tyrone (UKHC)
 North West Tyrone (UKHC)
 North Westmeath (UKHC)
 North Wexford (UKHC)
 North-West (EP)

O
 Old Leighlin (IHC)

P
 Philipstown (IHC)
 Portarlington (UKHC)
 Portarlington (IHC)

Q
 Queen's County:
 Queen's County (IHC)
 Queen's County (UKHC)
 Queen's County Leix (UKHC)
 Queen's County Ossory (UKHC)
 Queen's University of Belfast:
 Queen's University of Belfast (NIHC)
 Queen's University of Belfast (UKHC)

R
 Randalstown (IHC)
 Rathcormack (IHC)
 Ratoath (IHC)
 Roscommon:
 Roscommon (DÉ)
 Roscommon (UKHC)
 Roscommon Borough (IHC)
 Roscommon County (IHC)
 Roscommon North (UK Parliament constituency) (UKHC) See: North Roscommon
 Roscommon South (UK Parliament constituency) (UKHC) See: South Roscommon
 Roscommon–Leitrim (DÉ)
 Roscommon–South Leitrim (DÉ)

S
 St Canice (IHC)
 St Johnstown (IHC)
 St Johnstown (IHC)
 Sligo
 Sligo Borough (IHC)
 Sligo County (IHC)
 Sligo–Leitrim (DÉ)
 Sligo–North Leitrim (DÉ)
 Sligo–Mayo East:
 Sligo–Mayo East (DÉ)
 Sligo–Mayo East (SIHC)
 Sligo North (UK Parliament constituency) (UKHC) See: North Sligo
 Sligo, Roscommon and Leitrim (PP) County
 Sligo South (UK Parliament constituency) (UKHC) See: South Sligo
 South (EP)
 South Antrim:
 South Antrim (NIA)
 South Antrim (NICC)
 South Antrim (NIF)
 South Antrim (NIHC)
 South Antrim (UKHC)
 South Armagh (UKHC)
 South Cork (UKHC) See also under "Cork South"
 South Donegal (UKHC) See also "Donegal South"
 South Dublin (UKHC)
 South Down (NIA)
 South Down (NIHC) See also under "Down South"
 South Down
 South Fermanagh (NIHC) See also under "Fermanagh South"
 South Galway (UKHC)
 South Kilkenny (UKHC)
 South Kildare (UKHC) See also under "Kildare South"
 South Kerry UKHC) See also "Kerry South"
 South Leitrim (UKHC)
 Mid Londonderry: See also under "Londonderry South"
 Mid Londonderry (NIHC)
 South Londonderry (UKHC) 
 South Longford (UKHC)
 South Louth (UKHC)
 South Mayo (UKHC) See also under "Mayo North"
 South Meath (UKHC)
 South Monaghan (UKHC)
 South Roscommon (UKHC)
 South Sligo (UKHC)
 South Tipperary (UKHC)
 South Tyrone:
 South Tyrone (NIHC)
 South Tyrone (UKHC)
 South Westmeath (UKHC)
 South Wexford (UKHC)
 Sperrin (UKHC)
 Strabane (IHC)
 Strangford:
 Strangford (NIA)
 Strangford (NIF)
 Strangford (UKHC)
 Swords (IHC)

T
 Taghmon (IHC)
 Tallow (IHC)
 Thomastown (IHC)
 Tipperary:
 Tipperary (IHC) County
 Tipperary (DÉ)
 Tipperary (UKHC)
 Tipperary East (UK Parliament constituency) (UKHC) See: East Tipperary
 Tipperary Mid (UK Parliament constituency) (UKHC) See: Mid Tipperary
 Tipperary Mid, North and South:
 Tipperary Mid, North and South (SIHC)
 Tipperary Mid, North and South (DÉ)
 Tipperary North:
 Tipperary North (DÉ)
 Tipperary North (UK Parliament constituency) (UKHC) See: North Tipperary
 Tipperary South:
 Tipperary South (DÉ)
 Tipperary South (UK Parliament constituency) (UKHC) See: South Tipperary
 Tralee (IHC)
 Trim (IHC)
 Tuam (IHC)
 Tulsk (IHC)
 Tyrone (IHC) County
 Tyrone East:
 East Tyrone (Northern Ireland Parliament constituency) (NIHC) See: East Tyrone
 Tyrone East (UK Parliament constituency) (UKHC) See: East Tyrone
 Tyrone Mid:
 Tyrone Mid (Northern Ireland Parliament constituency) (NIHC) See: Mid Tyrone (Northern Ireland Parliament constituency)
 Tyrone Mid (UK Parliament constituency) (UKHC) See: Mid Tyrone
 Tyrone North:
 Tyrone North (Northern Ireland Parliament constituency) (NIHC) See: North Tyrone
 Tyrone North (UK Parliament constituency) (UKHC) See: North Tyrone (UKHC)
 Tyrone North-East (UK Parliament constituency) (UKHC) See: North East Tyrone
 Tyrone North-West (UK Parliament constituency) (UKHC) See: North West Tyrone
 Tyrone South:
 Tyrone South (Northern Ireland Parliament constituency) (NIHC) See: South Tyrone
 Tyrone South (UK Parliament constituency) (UKHC) See: South Tyrone 
 Tyrone West:
 Tyrone West (Assembly constituency) (NIA) See: West Tyrone
 Tyrone West (NIF)
 Tyrone West (Northern Ireland Parliament constituency) (NIHC) See: West Tyrone
 Tyrone West (UK Parliament constituency) (UKHC) See: West Tyrone

U
 Ulster Mid:
 Ulster Mid (Assembly constituency) (NIA) See: Mid Ulster
 Ulster Mid (NICC)
 Ulster Mid (NIF)
 Ulster Mid (UK Parliament constituency) (UKHC) See: Mid Ulster
 Upper Bann:
 Upper Bann (NIA)
 Upper Bann (NIF)
 Upper Bann (UKHC)

W
 Waterford (DÉ) County
 Waterford and Clonmel (PP) Cities
 Waterford and Tipperary (PP) County
 Waterford City (Parliament of Ireland constituency):
 Waterford City (IHC)
 Waterford City (UKHC)
 Waterford County (IHC)
 Waterford East (UK Parliament constituency) (UKHC) See: East Waterford
 Waterford–Tipperary East:
 Waterford–Tipperary East (SIHC)
 Waterford–Tipperary East (DÉ)
 Waterford West (UK Parliament constituency) (UKHC) See: West Waterford
 West Cavan (UKHC)
 West Clare (UKHC)
 West Cork (UKHC) See also under "Cork West"
 West Donegal (UKHC) See also "Donegal West"
 West Down:
 West Down (NIHC)
 West Down (UKHC)
 West Kerry (UKHC)
 West Limerick (UKHC) See also under "Limerick West"
 West Mayo (UKHC) See also under "Mayo North"
 West Tyrone:
 West Tyrone (NIA)
 West Tyrone (NIHC)
 West Tyrone (UKHC)
 West Waterford (UKHC)
 West Wicklow (UKHC)
 Westmeath (DÉ) County
 Westmeath (IHC) County
 Westmeath, Longford and King's (PP)
 Westmeath North (UKHC) See: North Westmeath (UKHC)
 Westmeath South (UKHC) See: South Westmeath (UKHC)
 Wexford (DÉ)
 Wexford Borough (IHC)
 Wexford County:
 Wexford County (IHC)
 Wexford County (UK Parliament constituency) (UKHC) See: County Wexford
 Wexford North (UK Parliament constituency) (UKHC) See: North Wexford
 Wexford South (UK Parliament constituency) (UKHC) See: South Wexford
 Wicklow:
 Wicklow (DÉ)
 Wicklow (UKHC)
 Wicklow Borough (IHC)
 Wicklow County (IHC)
 Wicklow East (UK Parliament constituency) (UKHC) See: East Wicklow
 Wicklow West (UK Parliament constituency) (UKHC) See: West Wicklow

Y
 Youghal:
 Youghal (IHC)
 Youghal (UKHC)

See also
 Irish House of Commons
 List of United Kingdom Parliament constituencies in Ireland and Northern Ireland
 Historic Dáil constituencies

Political history of Ireland
Politics of the Republic of Ireland